Palazzo Trevisan Cappello is a palace situated in Venice, Italy (in the sestiere of Castello) in front of Palazzo Patriarcale.

History
Built in the first half of the 16th century by the Trevisan family, the palace soon became the residence of Francesco I de' Medici.

Description
The façade of Trevisan Cappello is an example of Venetian Rinascimento: it has 37 windows, including three six-light windows. The ground floor has three pointed on to the canal. There are a lot of elegant marble decorations.

References

Trevisan Cappello